= Regional Courts of Eritrea =

The Regional Courts of Eritrea are an intermediate system of courts of appeal in Eritrea. It has both original and appellate jurisdiction.

Individual cases are heard by an individual judge. Defense counsels are permitted, to present cases but are typically appointed by the court, because defendants are rarely able to meet the cost of private representation.
